James Webber (1772 – 3 September 1847) was an English churchman, Dean of Ripon from 1828 until his death.

Webber was the son of Rev. William Webber, canon of Chichester Cathedral, and his wife Anne .

He was educated at Westminster School and Christ Church, Oxford matriculating in October 1789 aged 17, graduating B.A. 1793, M.A. 1796, B.D. 1807, D.D. 1809. He became tutor and censor at Christ Church.

Webber held the following positions in the church:
 Chaplain to Lord Robert Fitzgerald's Embassy at Copenhagen, 1795
 Chaplain to the Archbishop of York, 1811
 Prebendary of York Minster, 1812
 Vicar of Sutton-on-the-Forest, Yorkshire, 1812
 Chaplain House of Commons, 1812
 Rector of Kirkham, Lancashire, 1813–1847
 Prebendary of Westminster Abbey, 1816–1847 (also Sub-Dean)
 Rector of St Margaret's, Westminster, 1828–1835
 Dean of Ripon, 1828–1847

Webber was married to Caroline Frances Fynes, daughter of Rev. Dr. Charles Fynes Clinton, whom Webber succeeded as Rector of St. Margaret's after Fynes Clinton's death in 1827.

He died on 3 September 1847, aged 75, in Ripon.

References

1772 births
1847 deaths
People educated at Westminster School, London
Alumni of Christ Church, Oxford
Deans of Ripon
Canons of Westminster
Chaplains of the House of Commons (UK)